The Biennial of Hawaii Artists is an invitational exhibition of six or seven Hawaii artists that has been held at Spalding House since 1993.  It was originally organized by The Contemporary Museum, Honolulu and known as “The Contemporary Museum Biennial of Hawaii Artists”.  In 2011, The Contemporary Museum, Honolulu became part of the Honolulu Museum of Art, with the latter institution continuing the biennial.

The following is a list of participating artists:

Biennial I (1993)
 Dorothy Faison
 David Graves
 Randy Hokushin
 Wayne Levin
 Dean Oshiro
 Esther Shimazu
 Masami Teraoka

Biennial II (1995)
 Arabella Ark 
 Gaye Chan
 Sally French
 Don Ed Hardy
 Garnett Puett
 Frank Sheriff
 David Ulrich

Biennial III (1997)
 Donald Bernshouse
 Robert Hamada
 Renee Iijima
 Martin H. Peavy
 Franco Salmoiraghi
 Romolo Valencia

Biennial IV (1999)
 Margaret Ezekiel
 Nelson Flack
 Kapulani Landgraf
 R. Chiu Leong
 Mary Mitsuda
 Michael Tom

Biennial V (2001)
 Ben Kikuyama
 Hugh Russell
 Suzanne Saylor
 Masami Teraoka
 Kaori Ukaji
 Fae Yamaguchi

Biennial VI (2003)
 Ka’ili Chun
 Tom Lieber
 Wayne Morioka
 Deborah G. Nehmad
 Walter G. Nottingham
 Michael Takemoto

Biennial VII (2005)
 Charles Cohan
 Sergio Goes
 Claudia Johnson
 Michael Lee
 Jacqueline Rush Lee
 Michael Marshall
 Christopher Reiner

Biennial VIII (2008)
 Eli Baxter
 Vincent Goudreau
 Meidor Hu
 Javier Martinez
 Cade Roster
 Yida Wang
 Wayne Zebzda

Biennial IX (2010)
 Kloe Kang
 Scott Yoell
 Maika'i Tubbs
 Marc Thomas
 Abigail Romanchak
 Jason Teraoka
 Rosa Silver

Biennial X (2012)
 Mary Babcock
 Solomon Enos
 Jaisy Hanlon
 Jianjie Ji
 Sally Lundburg
 Bruna Stude

References
 Contemporary Museum, Honolulu, The Contemporary Museum Biennial of Hawaii Artists I, Contemporary Museum, Honolulu, 1993.
 Contemporary Museum, Honolulu, The Contemporary Museum Biennial of Hawaii Artists II, Contemporary Museum, Honolulu, 1995.
 Contemporary Museum, Honolulu, The Contemporary Museum Biennial of Hawaii Artists III, Contemporary Museum, Honolulu, 1997.
 Contemporary Museum, Honolulu, The Contemporary Museum Biennial of Hawaii Artists IV, Contemporary Museum, Honolulu, 1999.
 Contemporary Museum, Honolulu, The Contemporary Museum Biennial of Hawaii Artists V, Contemporary Museum, Honolulu, 2001.
 Contemporary Museum, Honolulu, The Contemporary Museum Biennial of Hawaii Artists VI, Contemporary Museum, Honolulu, 2003.
 Contemporary Museum, Honolulu, The Contemporary Museum Biennial of Hawaii Artists VII, Contemporary Museum, Honolulu, 2005.
 Contemporary Museum, Honolulu, The Contemporary Museum Biennial of Hawaii Artists VIII, Contemporary Museum, Honolulu, 2008.
 Contemporary Museum, Honolulu, The Contemporary Museum Biennial of Hawaii Artists IX, Contemporary Museum, Honolulu, 2010.
 Tully, Inger, “Biennial of Hawaii Artists X” in Honolulu Academy of Arts, Jan./Feb. 2012, p. 7.

Footnotes

Visual arts awards
Hawaii art
Artists from Hawaii
Contemporary art exhibitions